The 2022 Vermont gubernatorial election was held on November 8, 2022, to elect the governor of Vermont. Incumbent Republican Governor Phil Scott easily defeated Democrat Brenda Siegel for his 4th consecutive term.

This race was one of six Republican-held governorships up for election in 2022 in a state carried by Joe Biden in the 2020 presidential election. Scott's victory, in which he carried every municipality in the state, is the largest by margin in a Vermont gubernatorial race since Howard Dean's landslide in 1996. Scott's 46-point victory margin was the largest for a Republican candidate since 1950, even while Democratic congressman Peter Welch won the concurrent U.S. Senate election by a 40-point margin.

Republican primary

Candidates

Nominee
Phil Scott, incumbent governor

Eliminated in primary
Stephen Bellows, landscaping contractor
Peter Duval, engineer and former Underhill selectman

Declined
H. Brooke Paige, historian and perennial candidate (running for multiple statewide offices)

Results

Progressive primary

Candidates

Withdrew after winning primary 
Susan Hatch Davis, former state representative

Replacement nominee 
 Brenda Siegel, nonprofit executive, candidate for governor in 2018, and candidate for lieutenant governor in 2020 (cross-endorsement of Democratic nominee)

Results

Democratic primary

Candidates

Nominee
Brenda Siegel, nonprofit executive, candidate for governor in 2018, and candidate for lieutenant governor in 2020

Declined
Becca Balint, President pro tempore of the Vermont Senate (running for U.S. House)
T. J. Donovan, former Vermont Attorney General
Molly Gray, Lieutenant Governor of Vermont (ran for U.S. House)
Jill Krowinski, Speaker of the Vermont House of Representatives (running for re-election)
Doug Racine, former Lieutenant Governor of Vermont and candidate for governor in 2002 and 2010

Endorsements

Results

Independents

Candidates

Declared
 Peter Duval, engineer and former Underhill selectman
 Kevin Hoyt, candidate for governor in 2020
 Bernard Peters, perennial candidate

Write-ins

Candidates

Declared
Jacob W. Salvatore, high school student from New Jersey
Landon Best, high school student from Indiana
Alex Colley, high school student from Ohio
Dynah Hackett, high school student from Washington
Ayden Perkins, high school student from Nevada
Jackson Williams, high school student from Las Vegas

General election

Predictions

Polling
Graphical summary

Phil Scott vs. generic opponent

Results

See also 
 2022 Vermont elections

Notes

References

External links
Official campaign websites
Landon Best for Governor
Alex Colley for Governor
Ayden Perkins for Governor
Phil Scott (R) for Governor
Brenda Siegel (D) for Governor
Jackson Williams for Governor

2022
Governor
Vermont